Vadhu Budruk is a village in Shirur tehsil of Pune district.

The place is connected to Chatrapati Sambhaji Maharaj - the son of Chatrapati Shivaji Maharaj and Kavi Kalash. 
Chatrapati  Sambhaji Maharaj and his aide Kavi Kalash was killed in Tulapur and his samādhi was built in Vadhu. Thus, both these places are historically very important. Tulapur is situated on the banks of three rivers- Bhima, Bhama and Indrayani.

Tulapur was originally known as Nagargaon.

Vadhu is near Tulapur where Chatrapati Sambhaji Maharaj was cremated by Mahar who were formerly considered untouchable defying Aurangzeb threats. An idol of Chatrapati Sambhaji Maharaj was put up in 1977 in Vadhu along with Gaikwad's tomb.

References

Villages in Pune district